FC MEPhI Moscow was a Russian football team from Moscow. It played professionally for one season in 1997, taking 19th place in Zone 3 of the Russian Third Division. They were based at the Moscow university MEPhI.

Team name history
 1996: FSh MEPhI Moscow (for "Football School")
 1997: FC MEPhI Moscow

External links
  Team history at KLISF

Association football clubs established in 1996
Association football clubs disestablished in 1998
Defunct football clubs in Moscow
1996 establishments in Russia
1998 disestablishments in Russia